The International Journal of Data Science and Analytics is a peer-reviewed scientific journal covering data science. It was established in 2015 and is published by Springer Science+Business Media. The founding editor-in-chief is Longbing Cao (University of Technology Sydney).

Abstracting and indexing
The journal is abstracted and indexed in:
EI Compendex
Emerging Sources Citation Index
Inspec
Scopus

References

External links

Computer science journals